The Latin or Roman Catholic Archbishopric of Larissa is a titular see of the Catholic Church. It was established briefly as a residential episcopal see at Larissa, Thessaly, during the first decades of the Frankokratia period in place of the Greek Orthodox Metropolis of Larissa. Following the recovery of Larissa by the Greeks, the see became titular. The see has been vacant since the death of its last incumbent, Giuseppe Mojoli, in 1980.

History
Christianity penetrated early to Larissa, though its first bishop is recorded only in 325 at the Council of Nicaea. Following the Fourth Crusade and Thessaly's incorporation into the Kingdom of Thessalonica, a Roman Catholic archbishop was installed in the place of the previous Greek Orthodox occupant.

The city was soon recovered by the Greek Despotate of Epirus, however, possibly as early as 1212 and the Greek Orthodox metropolitan restored. Pope Honorius III later conferred the see of Thermopylae to the exiled Latin archbishop.

Titular bishops 

Honore Visconti, 1630
Antonio Pignatelli del Rastrello, later became Pope Innocent XII, 1652
Johann Hugo von Orsbeck, 1672
Baldassare Cardinal Cenci (Sr.), 1691
Francesco Acquaviva d’Aragona, 1697
Giovanni Battista Anguisciola, 1706
Luigi Carafa (Jr.), 1713
Troiano Acquaviva d’Aragona, 1930
Giovanni Saverio di Leoni, 1733
Bernardo Froilán Saavedra Sanjurjo, 1736
Pedro Clemente de Aróstegui, 1742
Blasius Paoli, 1750
Francesco Saverio Passari, 1786
Salvatore Maria Caccamo, O.S.A., 1815
Francesco Canali, 1827
Giuseppe Novak, 1843
François-Marie-Benjamin Richard, 1875
Giovanni Rebello Cardoso de Menezes, 1887
Agostino Ciasca, O.S.A., 1891
Diomede Angelo Raffaele Gennaro Falconio, O.F.M., 1899
Carlo Montagnini, 1913
Antonio Maria Grasselli, O.F.M.Conv., 1913
Felipe Arginzonis y Astobiza, O.C.D., 1918
Domenico Spolverini, 1933
José Horacio Campillo Infante, 1939
Antonio Giordani, 1956
Giuseppe Mojoli, 1960

See also
 List of Catholic titular sees

Notes

Sources 
 
 

Catholic titular sees in Europe
Medieval Thessaly
Former Roman Catholic dioceses in Greece
Larissa
History of Larissa
Kingdom of Thessalonica
Larissa
Frankokratia